Jon Arthur Stone (April 13, 1931 – March 30, 1997) was an American writer, director and producer, who was best known for being an original crew member on The Muppets' Sesame Street and is credited with helping develop characters such as Cookie Monster, Oscar the Grouch and Big Bird. Stone won 18 television Emmy Awards. Many regard him as one of the best children's television writers.

Biography 
Born in New Haven, Connecticut, to a physician,Stone attended Pomfret School and entered Williams College, graduating in 1952. He received a master's degree from the Yale University School of Drama in 1955, at which time he joined a CBS training program. It was then that Stone began his work in children's television, as a writer for Captain Kangaroo. He also worked on Kukla, Fran and Ollie. before moving on to Sesame Street as writer and producer. He also worked on several other Muppet projects before and during his time on Sesame Street, and was the author of several children's books, particularly The Monster at the End of This Book, published by Random House as a Little Golden Book.

Producing and writing 
Stone's earliest association with Jim Henson came in the early 1960s, working on fairy tale projects with writer Tom Whedon, such as a proposed Snow White series. This was turned into a Cinderella pilot, which was shot in October of that year but was not aired, and eventually became Hey, Cinderella!. Stone also appeared in Henson's 1967 short film Ripples, as an introspective architect.

In 1968, Stone brought Henson and Joe Raposo (who also worked on Hey, Cinderella!) to the attention of the Children's Television Workshop (now known as Sesame Workshop) president Joan Ganz Cooney when she started putting together Sesame Street.  He wrote the pilot script upon the request of Cooney, despite initially being reluctant: The Economist wrote in an obituary that Stone had intended to leave television. and was one of the three original producers of the program; he later served as an executive producer for many years.

Stone wrote specials including Big Bird in China and Big Bird in Japan.

Directing 
Stone was director of Sesame Street until 1996. He also directed the 1995 Christmas special Mr. Willowby's Christmas Tree. Stone directed Don't Eat the Pictures, a special that brought Sesame Street to the Metropolitan Museum of Art and won the Prix Jeunesse International.

Personal life 
Stone was married to former actress Beverley Owen. The couple had two daughters before divorcing in 1974.

Stone died in New York on March 30, 1997 of amyotrophic lateral sclerosis (ALS), which is also known as Lou Gehrig's Disease, two weeks before his 66th birthday. Posthumously, a memorial bench on the Literary Walk in Central Park was dedicated to Stone. The bench is located directly to the right of a bench dedicated to Jim Henson. In his New York Times obituary, Joan Ganz Cooney describes Stone as "probably the most brilliant writer of children's television material in America." Season 29 of Sesame Street was dedicated in his memory.

References

External links

 

Williams College alumni
American television writers
American male television writers
1932 births
1997 deaths
Sesame Street crew
Yale School of Drama alumni
Deaths from motor neuron disease
Writers from New Haven, Connecticut
Neurological disease deaths in New York (state)
Screenwriters from Connecticut
20th-century American screenwriters